Matthew 5:3 is the third verse of the fifth chapter of the Gospel of Matthew in the New Testament. It is the opening verse of the Sermon on the Mount, and the section of the sermon known as the Beatitudes.

Content

For a collection of other versions see BibleHub Matthew 5:3.

Interpretation
This verse opens the first of nine statements of who is blessed. Each, except for the last, follows the same pattern of naming a group of people and the reward they will receive.

Hans Dieter Betz notes that in Jesus' time blessed was a common way of describing someone who is wealthy. In his discussion of Croesus in Herodotus, for instance, the link between being blessed and being wealthy is assumed  . 
Similarly, Albright and Mann prefer the word "fortunate" to "blessed" for makarios. 
They argue that the term has none of the religious implications that the word blessed today has in the English language. 
Kodjak believes that this opening of the sermon was meant to shock the audience, it was a deliberate inversion of standard values. Today the text is so common that its shock value has been lost. While not a mainstream view, Betz feels this Beatitude has important pre-Christian precedents. He traces it back to Socrates' notion of enkrateia, which explained that the philosopher was one who had no interest in wealth. This idea was adopted by the Cynics, who rejected wealth and saw poverty as the only route to freedom. This group, while small, had a wide influence and some of their ideas were embraced by some Jewish communities at the time of Christ.

 simply has "blessed are the poor"; that Matthew adds "in spirit" is seen to be of great consequence. The phrase does not appear in the Old Testament, but  comes close. 
The phrase "poor in spirit" occurs in the Dead Sea Scrolls, and seems to have been an important notion to the Qumran community. Scholars agree that "poor in spirit" does not mean lacking in spirit, be it courage, the Holy Spirit, or religious awareness. Rather it is that poverty is not only a physical condition, but also a spiritual one. In fact, the more self aware a person is of his or her spiritual poverty caused by the innate human condition of the sinful nature, the more one is humbly aware that they are "poor in spirit" left to his or her own ways without Jesus Christ as Savior. Without Jesus the Christ alive and active in one's soul, it remains in a completely impoverished spiritual state; once a person declares Jesus as Lord and Savior of his or her life, Jesus sustains them through a daily renewing of their poor spirit: "Then Jesus declared, 'I am the bread of life. Whoever comes to me will never go hungry, and whoever believes in me will never be thirsty.'" (John 6:35). 

The important phrase Kingdom of Heaven is generally understood as referring to the Messianic age after the Second Coming. For a full discussion of Matthew's use of this phrase see Matthew 3:2.

See also 
 Related Bible parts: Psalm 34, Matthew 11, Luke 6

References

05:03
Heaven in Christianity
Beatitudes